The People's Peasant Party (abbr. НСС or NSS) is an agrarian political party in Serbia.

History 
It was founded in 1990, its first president being Dragan Veselinov. At this point, its policies were Vojvodina autonomist.

In the 1990 election it won one seat. In 1992 election it entered into a coalition with the League of Social Democrats of Vojvodina, and won no seats, and in the 1993 election, together with Civic Alliance of Serbia joined the centre-right DEPOS coalition, headed by Vuk Drašković, and won one seat. In the 1997 election it was part of the regionalist Vojvodina Coalition and won one seat.

Since 2002, the party has been led by Marijan Rističević. In 2003 it was expelled from the Vojvodina Coalition.

In the 2003 election, it was part of the far-right For National Unity coalition which won no seats. In the 2007 election the party ran on Serbian Renewal Movement's list, which won no seats. In the 2012 election it was part of a centre-right coalition around the Serbian Progressive Party and won one seat. In the 2014 election it was not formally in coalition with the Serbian Progressive Party, however it won one seat as Marijan Rističević was listed on the Progressives' electoral list.

Presidents

Electoral performance

Parliamentary elections

References

External links 
Official website (in Serbian)

1990 establishments in Serbia
Agrarian parties in Serbia
Conservative parties in Serbia
National conservative parties
Nationalist parties in Serbia
Political parties established in 1990
Political parties in Yugoslavia
Right-wing populism in Serbia
Right-wing populist parties
Serb nationalist parties